Mantovani is an Italian surname. Notable people with the surname include:

Alberto Mantovani (born 1948), Italian physician and immunologist
Alessandro Mantovani (1814–1892), Italian painter
Annunzio Paolo Mantovani (1905–1980), Anglo-Italian conductor
Bruno Mantovani (born 1974), French composer
Cencio Mantovani (1942–1989), Italian cyclist
Francesco Mantovani (1587/88–1674), Italian still life painter
Giovanni Mantovani (born 1955), Italian cyclist
Luca Mantovani (born 1968), Italian ice dancer and coach
Luigi Mantovani (1880–1957), Italian painter
Blessed Maria Domenica Mantovani (1862-1934), Italian Roman Catholic professed religious
Mario Mantovani (born 1950), Italian politician
Martín Mantovani (born 1984), Argentine footballer
Roberto Mantovani (1854–1933), Italian geologist and violinist
Tomás Altamirano Mantovani (c. 1960–2009), Panamanian politician and National Assembly deputy

Italian-language surnames